Biancucchi is an Italian surname. Notable people with the surname include:

Emanuel Biancucchi (born 1988), Argentine footballer, brother of Maxi
Maxi Biancucchi (born 1984), Argentine footballer

See also
Biancucci

Italian-language surnames